Kalyani Simanta railway station is the Kolkata Suburban Railway station and terminal station of Kalyani Simanta branch line of Sealdah railway division. It is situated beside A-B Connector, Kalyani in Nadia district in the Indian state of West Bengal.

History
The Calcutta (Sealdah)–Kusthia line of Eastern Bengal Railway was opened to run in the year of 1862. British Government in India established the railway station in the then Roosvelt town named Chandmari Halt in 1883. In 1954 it was renamed into Kalyani. In 1979, the rail line was extended from Kalyani main station to Kalyani Simanta and also established direct connectivity to  through Kalyani Simanta local EMU trains.

References

External links 
 

Sealdah railway division
Railway stations in Nadia district
Transport in Kalyani, West Bengal
Kolkata Suburban Railway stations